Tord Erland Grip (born 13 January 1938) is a Swedish former football coach and player. He has worked with several national teams, including England, Sweden, Indonesia, Mexico, the Ivory Coast and Kosovo.

Playing career
Grip began his football career as a teenager playing for Ytterhogdals IK, in which he as most footballers of his generation also played bandy, later playing part-time in the top flight for Degerfors IF and AIK while studying for his degree in Physical Education.

Coaching career 
Grip became a player/manager at KB Karlskoga in 1969, and has since managed several other clubs, Swedish, Italian and Swiss. 

He has also managed the national team for Norway, the Swedish women's senior team and men's under sixteen team, and has had two spells as assistant manager of the country's team for Sweden. After his second period as assistant manager of the national team, in 1998, Grip took up a coaching position at the club from Italy, S.S. Lazio, as the assistant of fellow Swedish manager Sven-Göran Eriksson. 

In January 2001, when Eriksson was appointed England manager, he brought Grip with him from Lazio as assistant manager, and he remained in the post until the end of the UEFA Euro 2004, and with England until the end of the 2006 FIFA World Cup. In November 2006, Grip was appointed special adviser to the club from Sweden, Djurgårdens IF.

On 6 July 2007, Grip became part of the backroom staff of Manchester City, when Sven-Göran Eriksson took over as manager of the club, it meant that Grip was re united with Eriksson, after their reign together in the set up of England. In June 2008, Grip was again reunited with Eriksson, after accepting an offer to become assistant manager of Mexico. 

In April 2009, after Eriksson was fired by the Mexico Football Federation due to a bad string of results, Eriksson and Grip took up the positions of Director of Football and General Advisor to the Director of Football at Notts County respectively. Grip is currently a freelance senior squad scout, for the team in the Premiership, Southampton. 

In February 2014, he was appointed as assistant manager of Kosovo.

Honours

Manager 
Malmö FF
Svenska Cupen: 1984

Sweden (assistant manager)
 FIFA World Cup third place: 1994

Lazio (assistant manager)
 Serie A: 1999–2000

References

External links 
 Profile on TheFA.com
 Profile at AIK

1938 births
People from Härjedalen
Living people
Swedish footballers
Sweden international footballers
Association football midfielders
Degerfors IF players
AIK Fotboll players
Swedish football managers
Swedish expatriate football managers
Malmö FF managers
Norway national football team managers
BSC Young Boys managers
Örebro SK managers
Degerfors IF managers
Sweden women's national football team managers
Expatriate football managers in Italy
Expatriate football managers in Switzerland
Swedish expatriate sportspeople in Norway
Expatriate football managers in Norway
Leicester City F.C. non-playing staff
Notts County F.C. non-playing staff
Manchester City F.C. non-playing staff